Indian Creek may refer to the following:

Communities

Belize
 Indian Creek Colony, in Orange Walk District
 Indian Creek, Toledo, in Toledo District

United States
 Indian Creek, Florida
 Indian Creek, Illinois
 Indian Creek No. 7 Precinct, Menard County, Illinois
 Indian Creek Settlement, Indiana
 Indian Creek, Missouri
 Indian Creek, Texas
 Indian Creek, West Virginia
 Indian Creek, Wisconsin
 Indian Creek Township (disambiguation)

Streams

Multiple states
Indian Creek (Blue River tributary), in Kansas and Missouri
Indian Creek (Thompson River tributary), in Iowa and Missouri

Arizona
Indian Creek (Hassayampa River tributary), near Ponderosa Park

California
Indian Creek (North Fork Feather River tributary), a tributary of the North Fork Feather River
Indian Creek (Plumas County, California)
Indian Creek (San Jacinto River tributary), a tributary of the San Jacinto River in Riverside County
Indian Creek (San Leandro River tributary), a tributary of San Leandro Creek, in Contra Costa County

Florida
Indian Creek (Miami Beach)

Idaho
Indian Creek (Boise River tributary)

Illinois
Indian Creek (Fox River tributary)

Indiana
Indian Creek (Fall Creek tributary), in Marion County
Indian Creek (Tippecanoe River tributary)

Iowa
Indian Creek (Cedar River tributary)
Indian Creek (Des Moines River tributary)
Indian Creek (Iowa River tributary)

Kansas
Indian Creek (Little Osage River tributary)
Indian Creek (Neosho River tributary)

Kentucky
Indian Creek (Barren River tributary), a tributary of the Big Barren River, in Monroe County

Maryland
Indian Creek (Severn River), a tributary of the Severn River, in Anne Arundel County

Missouri
Indian Creek (Big Piney River tributary)
Indian Creek (Black River tributary)
Indian Creek (Cole Camp Creek tributary)
Indian Creek (Courtois Creek tributary)
Indian Creek (Crooked Creek tributary)
Indian Creek (Elk River tributary)
Indian Creek (Establishment Creek tributary)
Indian Creek (Huzzah Creek tributary)
Indian Creek (Meramec River tributary)
Indian Creek (Mississippi River tributary)
Indian Creek (Monroe County, Missouri)
Indian Creek (Morgan County, Missouri)
Indian Creek (Niangua River tributary)
Indian Creek (North Fork River tributary), in Howell and Douglas counties
Indian Creek (North Fork Cuivre River tributary)
Indian Creek (St. Francis River tributary)
Indian Creek (Stone County, Missouri)

New York
Indian Creek (New York), a tributary of Cayuga Lake
Indian Creek (Black River, New York)
Indian Creek (Sand Hill Creek tributary)

North Carolina
Indian Creek (Deep River tributary), in Chatham County

Ohio
Indian Creek (Brandywine Creek tributary)

Pennsylvania
Indian Creek (Youghiogheny River tributary)
Indian Creek (Mauses Creek tributary)
Indian Creek (Cobbs Creek tributary)

Tennessee
Indian Creek (Tennessee River tributary), in Wayne and Hardin Counties
Indian Creek (Putnam County, Tennessee), a tributary of the Caney Fork River

Utah
Indian Creek (Beaver River tributary)

Washington
Indian Creek (Elwha River tributary)
Indian Creek (Hawk Creek tributary)
Indian Creek (Olympia, Washington), a tributary of the Moxlie Creek

West Virginia
Indian Creek (Guyandotte River tributary)
Indian Creek (Hughes River tributary)
Indian Creek (Middle Island Creek tributary)
Indian Creek (New River tributary)

Bridges
Indian Creek Bridge, east of Cedar Rapids, Iowa
Indian Creek Covered Bridge, Monroe County, West Virginia

Schools
Indian Creek Community Unit School District 425, DeKalb County, Illinois
Indian Creek High School (disambiguation)
Indian Creek Local School District, Wintersville, Ohio
Indian Creek School, Crownsville, Maryland

Transport
Indian Creek Railroad, a short-line railroad in Madison County, Indiana
Indian Creek station, a passenger rail station in Stone Mountain, Georgia
Indian Creek USFS Airport, Valley County, Idaho

Other
Indian Creek (climbing area), in Canyonlands, Utah
Indian Creek Correctional Center, Chesapeake, Virginia
Indian Creek massacre, near present-day Ottawa, Illinois, in 1832
Indian Creek Recreation Area, in Alexander State Forest, Rapides Parish, Louisiana
Indian Creek Wilderness Study Area, southern Utah

See also

Big Indian Creek (disambiguation)
Dead Indian Creek (disambiguation)
Indian Brook (disambiguation)
Indian River (disambiguation)
Indian Run (disambiguation)
Indian Stream (disambiguation)
Injun Creek, now Engine Creek, a stream in Tennessee